Kalleri is a village area in Vatakara taluk, north of Kozhikode, Kerala, India. Kalleri is located at Vatakara Thanneerpanthal route, 8 km from Vatakara, near Villiappaly. The land of Kalleri is encircled by Kallerikunnu to the west and Aroora mala (mountain) to the east. The famous Kalleri Kuttichathan Temple which is visited by thousands of devotees every week is in Kalleri. There is a canal at Kalleri, which is a part of Mahi canal.

Buildings and structures in Kozhikode district